Title 50 of the United States Code outlines the role of War and National Defense in the United States Code.

 : Council of National Defense
 : Board of Ordnance and Fortification (repealed)
 : Alien Enemies
 : Espionage (repealed/transferred)
 : Photographing, Sketching, Mapping, Etc., Defensive Installations (repealed)
 : Disclosure of Classified Information (repealed)
 : Atomic Weapons and Special Nuclear Materials Information Rewards
 : Arsenals, Armories, Arms, And War Material Generally
 : Willful Destruction, Etc., Of War Or National-Defense Material (repealed)
 : Interference With Homing Pigeons Owned by United States (repealed)
 : Explosives; Manufacture, Distribution, Storage, Use, And Possession Regulated (repealed)
 : Aircraft (repealed/transferred/omitted)
 : Helium Gas
 : Acquisition Of And Expenditures On Land For National-Defense Purposes (repealed/transferred/omitted)
 : Vessels In Territorial Waters of United States
 : Insurrection
 : Wartime Voting by Land and Naval Forces (repealed)
 : National Security (transferred)
 : Defense Industrial Reserves
 : Arming American Vessels (repealed)
 : Air-Warning Screen
 : Guided Missiles
 : Wind Tunnels
 : Abacá Production (omitted)
 : Uniform Code of Military Justice Repealed – see Title 10 of the United States Code
 : Representation Of Armed Forces Personnel Before Foreign Judicial Tribunals (repealed)
 : Internal Security
 : National Defense Facilities (repealed)
 : Armed Forces Reserve (repealed/omitted)
 : Gifts for Defense Purposes (repealed)
 : Reserve Officer Personnel Program (repealed/omitted)
 : Status of Armed Forces Personnel Appointed to Service Academies (repealed)
 : National Defense Contracts
 : Federal Absentee Voting Assistance (transferred)
 : Advisory Commission on Intergovernmental Relations (transferred)
 : Chemical and Biological Warfare Program
 : War Powers Resolution
 : National Emergencies
 : International Emergency Economic Powers
 : Foreign Intelligence Surveillance
 : National Security Scholarships, Fellowships, and Grants
 : Central Intelligence Agency Retirement and Disability
 : Spoils of War
 : Defense Against Weapons of Mass Destruction
 : National Nuclear Security Administration
 : Atomic Energy Defense Provisions
 : Preventing Weapons of Mass Destruction Proliferation and Terrorism
 : National Security
 : Miscellaneous Intelligence Community Authorities
 : Central Intelligence Agency
 : National Security Agency
 : Department of Defense Cooperative Threat Reduction
 : Military Selective Service
 : Servicemembers Civil Relief
 : War Claims
 : Restitution for World War II Internment of Japanese Americans and Aleuts
 : Trading with the Enemy
 : Merchant Ship Sales (repealed/transferred)
 : Defense Production Act
 : Export Administration
 : Claims Under the Clarification Act
 : Export Control Reform

External links
 
 U.S. Code Title 50, via Cornell University
 

Title 50
50